is the sixth single by Bump of Chicken. The title tracks are from the album . "Lost Man" is the song that writing took time most from summer of 2002 to the end of the year. Also "Sailing Day" featured as the end theme to the animated movie One Piece The Movie: Dead End no Bōken.

Track listing
All tracks written by Fujiwara Motoo.
 — 5:04
"Sailing Day" — 4:05
 (Hidden track) — 2:59

Personnel
Fujiwara Motoo — Guitar, vocals
Masukawa Hiroaki — Guitar
Naoi Yoshifumi — Bass
Masu Hideo — Drums

Chart performance

References

External links
ロストマン/Sailing Day on the official Bump of Chicken website.

2003 singles
Bump of Chicken songs
Japanese film songs
Songs written for animated films